BSE Tower or Bucharest Stock Exchange Tower is an office building located in the city of Bucharest, Romania. It has 16 floors and a surface of 14,000 m2. The building is the headquarters of the Bucharest Stock Exchange.

External links

Skyscraper office buildings in Bucharest

Office buildings completed in 2003